The Observatory of Saint-Veran is a French astronomical observatory located on the Pic de Château Renard in the municipality of Saint-Véran in the department of Hautes-Alpes in the French Alpes. At 2,930 meter altitude, it is one of the highest observatories in Europe next to the Sphinx Observatory. The Facility is managed by the French amateur astronomy association "AstroQueyras".

The observatory was built in 1974 as a branch of the Paris Observatory. In 1990 amateur astronomers were granted use of its 62 cm Cassegrain telescope.

The main-belt asteroid 48159 Saint-Véran was discovered at and named for the observatory and its hosting village. Presumably, it was the first discovery made at the observatory on 16 April 2001, synchronous with 264476 Aepic.

List of discovered minor planets 

The Minor Planet Center credits the observatory with the discovery of the following asteroids between 2001 and 2005:

See also 
 List of astronomical societies
 
 List of observatories

References

External links 
 Observatory homepage

Amateur astronomy organizations
Astronomical observatories in France
Buildings and structures in Hautes-Alpes

Minor-planet discovering observatories
Paris Observatory